The 2010 New Orleans city council elections were held on February 6, 2010, to determine the seven seats of the New Orleans City Council.  Runoff elections for districts A and E were held on March 6, 2010.

February 6 elections

At-Large Council Spots

Turnout: 16.3%

District A

Turnout: 39.4%

District B

Turnout: 29.7%

District C

Turnout: 32.4%

District D

Turnout: 31.6%

District E

Turnout: 28.7%

March 6 run-off elections

District A

Turnout: 20.9%

District E

Turnout: 15.2%

References

New Orleans city council
New Orleans 2010
2010 Louisiana elections